This is a list of Maldivian films released in 2011.

Releases

Feature film

Short film

Television
This is a list of Maldivian series, in which the first episode was aired or streamed in 2011.

References

External links

Maldivian
2011